Ernest Judson Wilson (February 28, 1894 – June 24, 1963), nicknamed "Boojum", was an American third baseman, first baseman, and manager in Negro league baseball. He played for the Baltimore Black Sox, the Homestead Grays, and the Philadelphia Stars between 1922 and 1945. Wilson was known for possessing a unique physique, a quick temper, and outstanding hitting skills. One of the Negro leagues' most powerful hitters, his career batting average of .351 ranks him among the top five players.

Wilson was posthumously elected to the Baseball Hall of Fame in 2006, one of 17 black Negro league or pre-Negro league players inducted that year.

Early life
Wilson was born in Remington, Virginia.

As a teenager, he moved to Foggy Bottom in Washington, D.C.

The first mention of Wilson's early life was his induction into the United States Army on June 29, 1918, where he served in World War I as a corporal in Company D, 417th Service Battalion.

Career
Wilson debuted for the Baltimore Black Sox in 1922. Though Wilson was referred to as "Babe Ruth Wilson" by the media, his teammates nicknamed him "Boojum" after the noise his line drives made after striking the outfield fences. The team went on a 12-game winning streak after Wilson joined the club. He finished his first season with a .390 batting average and a team high in home runs. The Black Sox joined the Eastern Colored League in 1923. Wilson hit .373 that season, leading the league. However, the team finished in last place, prompting the hiring of Pete Hill as the team's manager.

During the 1920s, Wilson was also enjoying remarkable success playing winter baseball in the Cuban League. His career batting average there was the highest in league history.

Wilson moved to the Homestead Grays for 1931 and part of 1932, finishing that season with the Pittsburgh Crawfords. He joined the Philadelphia Stars in 1933. In the 1934 Negro National League playoffs, Wilson struck an umpire but was not removed from the game. The incident raised questions about the league's ability to enforce rules against the top players and the most influential teams. In 1940, Wilson returned to the Homestead Grays. He played with the team through 1945, when he was 49 years old.

Struggling with his fielding skills, Wilson often blocked or knocked down batted balls rather than catching them with his glove. Because of his strong arm, he was still able to throw runners out on such plays. He had an unusual physique, standing 5'8" and weighing 195 pounds with a large torso, a small waist, bowed legs and pigeon toe. Pitcher Satchel Paige claimed that Wilson and Chino Smith were the two toughest outs he ever faced (Wilson hit .375 against Paige). Catcher Josh Gibson said that Wilson was the best hitter in baseball.

Wilson was known for a bad temper and a willingness to get into physical altercations. His friend Jake Stephens said, "The minute he saw an umpire, he became a maniac." A well-circulated story involved Wilson holding Stephens out of a 16th story window by one leg after Stephens came in late and woke him. Others, including Judy Johnson and Ted Page, described him as different off the field. "He'd do anything in the world for you," Johnson said. Late in his career, Wilson developed epilepsy. During a Negro World Series game, Wilson began to draw circles in the dirt and was said to be unaware of his surroundings.

Later life
After retiring, he worked on a road construction crew in Washington, D.C. He had to be institutionalized late in life. Wilson died at age 69 in Washington, D.C. and was buried in Arlington National Cemetery.

Legacy
Wilson was elected to the Baseball Hall of Fame by the Negro Leagues Committee in 2006. Wilson was elected in a class of 17 Negro league and black pre-Negro league inductees, the largest such group inducted in Hall of Fame history. Hall of Fame officials did not think that Wilson had any living relatives, but a great-niece heard about his scheduled induction and was able to attend the ceremony on his behalf. In 2010, the Washington Nationals honored Wilson and five other Homestead Grays in the Hall of Fame by including them in a Hall of Fame Ring of Honor at Nationals Park.

See also
List of Negro league baseball players

References

External links

 and Baseball-Reference Black Baseball stats and Seamheads
  and Seamheads
Negro League Baseball Players Association - biography

1894 births
1963 deaths
National Baseball Hall of Fame inductees
Baltimore Black Sox players
Pittsburgh Crawfords players
Homestead Grays players
Baseball players from Virginia
People from Fauquier County, Virginia
Burials at Arlington National Cemetery
Philadelphia Stars players
United States Army personnel of World War I
20th-century African-American sportspeople